Dixons Allerton Academy (formerly Rhodesway Academy) is a coeducational all-through school and sixth form located in Allerton area of the City of Bradford, in the English county of West Yorkshire.

Previously a community school administered by Bradford City Council, Rhodesway School converted to academy status in September 2009 and was renamed Dixons Allerton Academy. The school is now part of the Dixons Academy Trust, which includes Dixons City Academy, Dixons Kings Academy, Dixons McMillan Academy, Dixons Trinity Academy and Dixons Sixth Form Academy

Dixons Allerton Academy offers GCSEs and BTECs as programmes of study for pupils, while students in the sixth form have the option to study from a range of A-levels and further BTECs.

Notable former pupils
Clayton Donaldson, footballer
Dean Richards, former footballer

References

External links
Dixons Allerton Academy official website

Secondary schools in the City of Bradford
Academies in the City of Bradford
Primary schools in the City of Bradford